Korea Mining Development Trading Corporation (also known as Changgwang Shinyong Corporation, Kapmun Tosong, KOMID) is North Korea’s primary arms dealer, and main exporter of goods and equipment related to ballistic missiles and conventional weapons.

History
Korea Mining Development Trading Corporation (KOMID), a North Korean state-owned entity, was previously listed in the annex to E.O. 13382 on July 1, 2005 for its role in North Korea's proliferation of weapons of mass destruction.  It was also sanctioned by the United Nations in April 2009 and 29 October 2014.  KOMID has offices in multiple countries around the world and facilitates weapons sales for the North Korean government.

Employees
Yo’n Cho’ng Nam (chief representative);
Ko Ch’o’l-Chae (deputy chief representative);
Kim Kyu (external affairs officer);
Kil Jong Hun;
Kim Kwang Yon;
Jang Song Chol;
Kim Yong Chol;
Jang Yong Son;
Ryu Jin;
Kang Ryong.

References

Defence companies of North Korea
Nuclear program of North Korea
Sanctions against North Korea
North Korean entities subject to the U.S. Department of the Treasury sanctions